The George W. Eddy House is a historic house at 85 Bigelow Road in Newton, Massachusetts.  The -story stucco-clad house was built in 1913 for George W. Eddy, a merchant, to a design by the noted area firm of Chapman & Frazer.  It is Newton's finest example of Craftsman styling; its slate hip roof includes curved sections above paired windows, a detail that is repeated in dormers that pierce the roof.  A shed-style roof along a portion of the main facade shelters a recessed main entrance, whose flanking sidelight windows contain leaded glass.

The house was listed on the National Register of Historic Places in 1990.

See also
 National Register of Historic Places listings in Newton, Massachusetts

References

Houses on the National Register of Historic Places in Newton, Massachusetts
Houses completed in 1913
1913 establishments in Massachusetts